King's Sedgemoor is a piece of rich animal habitat and farming land, that forms part of the Somerset Levels and Moors in South West England.

The area of King's Sedgemoor fell within the Whitley Hundred,

It is a Site of Special Scientific Interest, at the centre of the larger Altcar series peat basin of King’s Sedgemoor; lying between the Sowy River to the west, Cradle Bridge to the east and extending to the south over Beer Wall into part of Aller Moor.  It is adjacent to the Greylake SSSI.

King's Sedgemoor Drain, originally constructed in 1797-8, proved inadequate for draining the village of Chedzoy's moors, so in 1861 the Chedzoy Internal Drainage District built a small pumping station on the River Parrett, in Westonzoyland parish, to drain the Chedzoy moors southwards.

References

External links
1771 Parliamentary summary on petitions for/against drainage
Angling in Somerset - guide to King's Sedgmoor Drain
Map - Inclosure of King's Sedgemoor 1795

Geography of Somerset
Somerset Levels
Sites of Special Scientific Interest in Somerset